The 1988–89 Xavier Musketeers men's basketball team represented Xavier University from Cincinnati, Ohio in the 1988–89 season. Led by head coach Pete Gillen, the Musketeers finished with a 21–12 record (7–5 MCC), and won the MCC tournament to receive an automatic bid to the NCAA tournament. In the NCAA tournament, the Musketeers lost to the eventual National champion, Michigan, in the opening round.

Roster

Schedule and results

|-
!colspan=9 style=| Regular season

|-
!colspan=9 style=| Midwestern Collegiate Conference tournament

|-
!colspan=9 style=| NCAA Tournament

References

Xavier
Xavier Musketeers men's basketball seasons
Xavier